Vatroslav Lichtenegger (1809-1885) was a Croatian music teachr and composer.

Born in Podčetrtek, he moved to Zagreb around 1827, and became a choralist in the Zagreb Cathedral as well as a teacher at the Croatian Music Institute.
Lichtenegger was a teacher of singing and organist of the Zagreb Cathedral. He scored and harmonized the song Horvatska domovina by Josip Runjanin for a male choir in 1861. In 1891, the song won a competition to become the Croatian national anthem.

He is buried in the Mirogoj cemetery in Zagreb. His daughter was famous opera singer Mathilde Mallinger.

References

1809 births
1885 deaths
Croatian people of German descent
Croatian composers
Burials at Mirogoj Cemetery
19th-century composers